Danthala Venkata Meher Baba is a former Indian cricketer. He represented Andhra Pradesh in the Ranji Trophy from 1971 to 1989, he also represented the Hyderabad Ranji Trophy Team in 1978. He was a left-hand batsman and left-arm spinner with 16-year first-class career spanning from 1970 to 1987. He made 2649 runs, with a highest of 134 not out against Goa, He also scored 20 half centuries and took 173 wickets with his slow left arm orthodox bowling with five for 32 being the best bowling figures, he had a total of five five-wicket hauls.

Early years
Meher Baba was born on 2 January 1950 in Kakinada, East Godavari District, Andhra Pradesh in India, he was the only son of Shri. Danthala Ramayya Naidu and Smt. Danthala Padmamma. He was named after Avatar Meher Baba.

Venkata Meher started to play cricket at an age of 17, where he was selected to represent East Godavari District in the Junior State selection Championship in 1967 in Kakinada. He showed exceptional skill in his left arm orthodox spin bowling and left hand batting, his consistent performance in the Junior State Cricket Championship got him selected to represent the Andhra Ranji Trophy Team in 1971.

Cricket career
Meher Baba made his debut against Mysore in January 1972 at Vijayawada. Meher Baba took his first wicket on 27 October 1972, against Kerala at Kurnool, this was his 4th first class match. Because of inconsistent debutant performances in the first 5 matches, Andhra's Captain B. Mahendra Kumar dropped Meher Baba from the playing 11, against Tamil Nadu in Madras on 3 December 1972. Andhra however lost this match by 105 runs.

Under a new captaincy of B. Ram Prasad, Meher Baba was brought back into the playing 11 the next season, on 3 November 1973 against Hyderabad on Kottagurem. Batting first Andhra were all out for a low score 51, in which Meher Baba stayed not out scoring 14 runs. He bowled an excellent spell of 15 overs taking 5 wickets for 32 runs, in which he tore apart the Hyderabad batting line up of K. Jayantilal, N. Mehta, Mumtaz Hussain, M. L. Jaisimha and Abdul Hai. He complete the season with 11 wickets in 4 matches. Meher Baba scored his debut 50 (59 run out) against Karnatake on 11 November 1974. Meher Baba played a match winning role in the second innings against Kerala at Guntur on 16 December 1974, where Meher took 3 wickets for 22 runs in 11.2 overs. This victory by 22 runs against Kerala on 16 December was the first ever for Andhra since his participation in the Ranji Trophy Championship. Andhra went on to win another nail biting match by just 1 run against Tamil Nadu at Salem on 6 January 1975.

BCCI selection committee
After his retirement from cricket, Meher Baba was appointed to be part of the Under-19 National Selection committee in 1989. He was part of the committee from 1990 to 1996 and also served on the Andhra Cricket Association Selection Committee. He coached the Andhra Ranji team from 1999 to 2005 and also the coach for the Under-19 Andhra State team in 1998.

Death
Meher Baba battled against Lung Cancer for 2 years, and died on 16 January 2008 at his residence in Sainikpuri, Secunderabad, AP. His death was condolenced by the media, the Hyderabad Cricket Association as well the Andhra Cricket Association.

Since 2008, Telugu Association of Canada and Robin Singh Foundation conduct the annual "Danthala Meher Baba Cricket Trophy". In 2012, BCCI has named the Under-16 South Zone inter-state women's tournament as "Danthala Meher Baba Memorial Cricket Tournament".

References

External links

1950 births
2008 deaths
People from Kakinada
Indian cricketers
Andhra cricketers
South Zone cricketers
Hyderabad cricketers
Cricketers from Andhra Pradesh